is a former Japanese football player and manager.

Playing career
Harada was born in Kashima on October 2, 1971. After graduating from Waseda University, he joined Yokohama Flügels in 1994. He became a regular player as defensive midfielder from first season and the club won the champions 1994–95 Asian Cup Winners' Cup. Although his opportunity to play decreased behind Motohiro Yamaguchi and César Sampaio from 1995, he played many matches as center back not only defensive midfielder from 1997. The club won the champions 1998 Emperor's Cup. However the club was disbanded end of 1998 season due to financial strain, he moved to Cerezo Osaka in 1999. He became a regular player as defensive midfielder. In June 2000, he moved to newly was promoted to J1 League club, Kawasaki Frontale. Although the club won the 2nd place 2000 J.League Cup, was relegated to J2 League. In 2001, he moved to J2 club Oita Trinita. In 2002, he moved to J2 club Avispa Fukuoka. Although he played many matches, he left the club end of 2003 season. After 1 season blank, he joined Regional Leagues club V-Varen Nagasaki. He played many matches every season and the club was promoted to Japan Football League from 2009. He retired end of 2010 season.

Coaching career
After retirement, Harada started coaching career at V-Varen Nagasaki in 2012. In 2017, he moved to newly was relegated to J3 League club, Giravanz Kitakyushu and became a manager. Although Giravanz aimed to return to J2 League, the club finished at the 9th place of 17 clubs and he resigned end of 2017 season.

Club statistics

Managerial statistics

References

External links
 
 
 geocities.co.jp

1971 births
Living people
Waseda University alumni
Association football people from Saga Prefecture
Japanese footballers
J1 League players
J2 League players
Japan Football League players
Yokohama Flügels players
Cerezo Osaka players
Kawasaki Frontale players
Oita Trinita players
Avispa Fukuoka players
V-Varen Nagasaki players
Japanese football managers
J2 League managers
J3 League managers
Giravanz Kitakyushu managers
V-Varen Nagasaki managers
Association football midfielders